Italia Pennino Coppola (December 12, 1912 – January 21, 2004) was the matriarch of the Coppola family. She appeared in three non-speaking roles in Francis Ford Coppola's movies, One from the Heart, The Godfather Part II and The Godfather Part III. She was known for her Italian cooking and published a cookbook called Mama Coppola's Pasta Book. Her nickname "Mammarella" is the name of her pasta and sauce line. Francis Ford Coppola named his 1998 Edizione Pennino zinfandel after her family’s name and Italian heritage. Her image has also appeared on the "Mammarella" pasta and sauce line, named after her and made by her son Francis.

Early life 
Born in New York City, she was one of six children of Anna (née Giaquinto) (1879-?) and composer Francesco Pennino (1880-1952), both from Naples, Italy. Her father was a musician and composer of Italian songs, an importer of silent Italian films and a movie theater owner. She was born in an apartment over the family's Empire Theater in Brooklyn.

Coppola family matriarch 
Italia Pennino Coppola was the wife of Carmine Coppola and the mother of academic August Coppola, filmmaker Francis Ford Coppola and actress Talia Shire, as well as the maternal grandmother of actors Jason Schwartzman, Robert Carmine and writer Matthew Shire, and the paternal aunt of talent manager Anthony Pennino, and paternal grandmother of actors Nicolas Cage, Marc Coppola and directors Roman Coppola, Christopher Coppola and Sofia Coppola.

Under her maiden name, Pennino, Italia Coppola was a lyricist known for writing "Non ci Lasceremo Mai", Connie's wedding song from The Godfather, the Sicilian lyrics for "Ninna-Nanna A Michele", consisting of The Godfather Waltz and Michael's Theme, composed by Nino Rota and sung by Nino Palermo in The Godfather Part II soundtrack, "Come Back To Love (the Chief's Death)" from Apocalypse Now, and songs from Carmine Coppola themes from Napoleon, The Black Stallion, and The Outsiders.

Death 
Italia Pennino Coppola is buried in San Fernando Mission Cemetery alongside her husband.

Filmography

See also 
Coppola family tree

References

External links
San Francisco Chronicle Obituary

1912 births
2004 deaths
Italia 
American people of Italian descent
People of Campanian descent
People of Lucanian descent
People from Brooklyn